Woodbury College was an institute of higher learning in Montpelier, Vermont, USA. It was established in 1975.

In August 2008, it merged with Champlain College, where its 125 students were transferred. The campus was purchased by the Community College of Vermont.

References

External links
 Home Page

Buildings and structures in Montpelier, Vermont
Defunct private universities and colleges in Vermont
Educational institutions established in 1975